Pertusaria lichexanthoimmersa is a rare species of crustose and corticolous (bark-dwelling) lichen in the family Pertusariaceae. Found in Bahia, Brazil, it was formally described as a new species in 2018 by lichenologists André Aptroot and Marcela Eugenia da Silva Cáceres. Pertusaria lichexanthoimmersa is only known to occur at the type locality (part of the Chapada Diamantina mountains), and is only known from the type specimen. The specific epithet lichexanthoimmersa refers both to the presence of lichexanthone as a secondary chemical, and the apothecia, which are immersed in the thallus. The lichen also contains norstictic acid.

See also
List of Pertusaria species

References

lichexanthoimmersa
Lichen species
Lichens described in 2018
Lichens of Northeast Brazil
Taxa named by André Aptroot
Taxa named by Marcela Cáceres